Penicillifera is a genus of moths of the family Bombycidae. The genus was erected by Wolfgang Dierl in 1978.

Selected species
Penicillifera apicalis (Walker, 1862)
Penicillifera infuscata Dierl, 1978
Penicillifera lactea (Hutton, 1865)
Penicillifera tamsi (Lemée, 1950)

References

Bombycidae